"Jarama Valley" also known as "El Valle del Jarama" is a song from the Second Spanish Republic. Referring to the Spanish Civil War Battle of Jarama, the song uses the tune of Red River Valley.

The battle was fought from 6–27 February 1937, in the Jarama river valley a few kilometres east of Madrid. The seasoned troops of Franco's Army of Africa assaulted positions held by the inexperienced volunteers of the International Brigades, in particular the British and the Dimitrov battalions. It ended in stalemate, with both sides entrenching. At the end of three weeks, in particular after a counter-attack on what became known as "Suicide Hill", the death count was high. The British Battalion lost 225 of its 600 men and the Lincoln Battalion lost 125 out of 500.

Original four-verse versions
The earliest known version of the lyrics was written by Alex McDade, of the British Battalion, XV International Brigade and published in 1938 in The Book of the XV International Brigade by the Commissariat of War, Madrid, 1938.  It is squarely a soldier's song; grumbling about the boredom, lack of leave and lack of female company. McDade was a labourer from Glasgow who became a political commissar in the XV International Brigade, responsible for the men's welfare.  He was wounded at Jarama and died in hospital in Glasgow of wounds sustained 6 July 1937 at the Battle of Brunete. Perhaps McDade wrote the song to focus his comrades' minds on something other than the casualties, but "its humorous cynicism made it popular in all battalions". Although the provenance of the other early version is unknown it was probably written for (or evolved at) post-war veterans reunions. According to scholar Jim Jump, it was first published on 8 January 1939 in London in a booklet for a British Battalion reunion and "has continued to be sung at International Brigade commemorative events".

Woody Guthrie version
Lyrics:

Three-verse versions: Jarama Valley / El Valle del Jarama
This shorter (three-verse) version of the song—with variant versions, are something of an anthem for veterans, particularly those from the Abraham Lincoln Battalion. Woody Guthrie and Pete Seeger have recorded it. In addition to this version, other Spanish variants exist.

German version: In dem Tal dort am Rio Jarama (Lincoln-Bataillion)

Ernst Busch, the famous communist actor, singer and participant in the Spanish Civil War, wrote and sang a German text for this song, which is known under the title "In dem Tal dort am Rio Jarama" (In that valley there at Rio Jarama") or as "Lied des Lincoln Bataillions" (Song of Lincoln Battalion)

Russian version: Jarama valley (Батальон Линкольна)
There is a Russian version of "Jarama Valley" too. It is actually a poetical translation of Ernst Buch's text by Tatiana Vladimirskaya with another arrangement for music. The Russian variant is not very similar to the "canonical" text and is much more optimistic

Notes and references

 Hugh Thomas, "The Spanish Civil War". Hugh Thomas' first edition of "The Spanish Civil War" was published in 1961. There have been several editions and updates of this basic account of the war, published in both Spanish and in English. The 1961 English edition was first published by Eyre and Spotriswoode Ltd. Penguin published a revised and updated edition in 1965. The fourth Edition was published in the UK and Canada by Penguin in 2003. The description of the battle and the generous involvement of the British, Irish and North American volunteers may be found in pages 571 through 578. According to Thomas, the Lincoln Brigade, 450 effectives in total, suffered 275 casualties, with 120 deaths. Thomas himself cites Between the Bullet and the Lie, by Cecil Eby, New York, 1969, as the best account of the Lincoln Battalion. "La Guerra Civil española" was published in 1967, in Paris, by Editorial Ruedo Ibérico.
 Beevor, Antony. (2006). The Battle for Spain: The Spanish Civil War 1936-1939. London: Weidenfeld & Nicolson. 
 Jump, Jim (ed) (2006). Poets from Spain: British and Irish International Brigaders on the Spanish Civil War London: Lawrence & Wishart. 
 Ryan, Frank (ed.) [1938] (1975). The Book of the XV International Brigade  Madrid: Commissariat of War [1938]. Newcastle upon Tyne: Frank Graham (facsimile edition 1975). ISBN B001A6IG7W

External links 
Valley of Jarama by Woody Guthrie (poor quality)
Veterans' accounts of the battle

Political party songs
Songs of the Spanish Civil War
1938 songs